Ahmed Adam is the name of

 Ahmed Adam Salah (born 1966), Sudanese marathon runner
 Ahmed Adam (swimmer) (born 1987), Sudanese swimmer